The RD-0243 is a propulsion module composed of an RD-0244 main engine and a RD-0245 vernier engine. Both are liquid rocket engine, burning N2O4 and UDMH. The RD-0244 main engine operates in the oxidizer rich staged combustion cycle, while the vernier RD-0245 uses the simpler gas generator cycle. Since volume is at a premium on submarine launches, this module is submerged on the propellant tank. Its development period was from 1977 to 1985, having had its first launch on December 27, 1981. Originally developed for the RSM-54, it was used later for the Shtil'.

See also

R-29RM Shtil
Shtil'
Rocket engine using liquid fuel

References

External links 
 KbKhA official information on the engine. (Archived)
 Encyclopedia Astronautica information on the propulsion module. (Archived)

Rocket engines of the Soviet Union
Rocket engines using hypergolic propellant
Sea launch to orbit
Rocket engines using the staged combustion cycle
KBKhA rocket engines